Cesaperua is a genus of tachinid flies found in Brazil. There is one described species, Cesaperua xanthomelanoides.

Taxonomy
It was originally described as Xenophasia in 1934, though that name was preoccupied by a genus of birds (Xenophasia Strickland, 1841, itself a correction for Zenophasia Swainson, 1838). The replacement name Cesaperua was coined in 2010 and is a combination of "CESA" (Centre for Entomological Studies Ankara in Turkey) and Peru, a mistaken reference to the presumed type locality, which is actually in Brazil.

References

Tachinidae
Tachinidae genera
Monotypic Brachycera genera
Insects of Brazil